The 1934 United States Senate election in Maryland was held on November 5, 1934.

Incumbent Republican Senator Phillips Lee Goldsborough did not seek re-election to a second term in office. In the open race to succeed him, Democratic Maryland Secretary of State George L. P. Radcliffe defeated former Senator Joseph I. France.

Republican primary

Candidates
 Joseph I. France, former U.S. Senator from 1917 to 1923
 John Philip Hill, U.S. Representative from Baltimore
 C. Wilbur Miller

Results

Democratic primary

Candidates
 William Milnes Maloy, candidate for Governor in 1926
 George L. P. Radcliffe, Maryland Secretary of State

Results

General election

Results

Results by county

Counties that flipped from Republican to Democrat
Anne Arundel
Baltimore (County)
Caroline
Dorchester
Frederick
Harford
Kent
Montgomery
Prince George's
Somerset
Talbot
Wicomico
Worcester

See also
1934 United States Senate elections
1934 United States elections

References

Notes

1934
Maryland
United States Senate